The 2012–13 Georgia Southern Eagles men's basketball team represented Georgia Southern University during the 2012–13 NCAA Division I men's basketball season. The Eagles, led by fourth year head coach Charlton Young, played their home games at Hanner Fieldhouse and were members of the South Division of the Southern Conference. They finished the season 14–19, 7–11 in SoCon play to finish in a tie for third place in the South Division. They lost in the quarterfinals of the SoCon tournament to Davidson.

Roster

Schedule

|-
!colspan=9| Regular season

|-
!colspan=9| 2013 Southern Conference men's basketball tournament

References

Georgia Southern Eagles men's basketball seasons
Georgia Southern